Ab Garm (also Romanized as Āb Garm) is a village in Hoseynabad Rural District, Esmaili District, Anbarabad County, Kerman Province, Iran. At the 2006 census, its population was 384, in 81 families.

References 

Populated places in Anbarabad County